The 2018 PDC Unicorn World Youth Championship was the eighth edition of the PDC World Youth Championship, a tournament organised by the Professional Darts Corporation for darts players aged between 16 and 23.

In a change mirroring that of the 2019 PDC World Darts Championship, the field of this competition increased from 64 to 96 players, who competed in 32 groups of three, with the winner of each progressing to the knockout stages.

The group stage and knock-out phase from the last 32 to the semi-finals was played at Robin Park Centre, Wigan, on 5 November 2018. The final took place on 25 November 2018, before the final of the 2018 Players Championship Finals.

Belgium's Dimitri Van den Bergh was the defending champion after defeating English player Josh Payne 6–3 in the 2017 final.

Van den Bergh successfully defended his youth title by beating Germany's Martin Schindler 6–3 in the final.

Van den Bergh became the first player to defend the title and overall to win two times the PDC World Youth Title.

Prize money

Qualifiers

74 players from the final 2018 PDC Development Tour Order of Merit qualified, as did 22 international qualifiers. Tahuna Irwin, who would have been the 23rd international qualifier, withdrew due to an issue with immigration. Bradley Brooks, Dawson Murschell and Rusty-Jake Rodriguez qualified through the Development Tour Order of Merit as well as through an International Qualifier, which means the players ranked 75, 76 and 77 all qualified. Levy Frauenfelder replaced Jakob Kelly.

Development Tour qualifiers:

  Luke Humphries
  Dimitri Van den Bergh
  Ted Evetts
  Geert Nentjes
  Martin Schindler
  George Killington
  Rowby-John Rodriguez
  Ryan Meikle
  Niels Zonneveld
  Christian Bunse
  Jarred Cole
  Nathan Rafferty
  Berry van Peer
  Kenny Neyens
  Wessel Nijman
  Rob Hewson
  Bradley Brooks
  Jimmy Hendriks
  Dawson Murschell
  George Gardner
  Bradley Kirk
  Justin van Tergouw
  Mike De Decker
  Rhys Griffin
  Tommy Wilson
  Rusty-Jake Rodriguez
  Lee Budgen
  Rhys Hayden
  Brian Raman
  Scott Dale
  Melvin de Fijter
  Joe Davis 
  William Borland
  Josh McCarthy
  Callan Rydz
  Harry Ward
  Danny van Trijp
  Jordan Boyce
  Jeffrey de Zwaan
  Tom Lonsdale
  Shane McGuirk
  Lewis Pride
  Greg Ritchie
  Mike van Duivenbode
  Kevin Doets
  Nico Blum
  Patrick van den Boogaard
  Dean Finn
  Callum Loose
  John Brown 
  Sven Groen
  Mark Baxter
  Maikel Verberk
  Thomas Lovely
  Carl Batchelor
  Justin Smith
  Hendrik Eggermann
  Jaikob Selby
  Dylan Powell
  Scott Jackson
  Christopher Hansch
  Jakob Kelly
  Fred Box
  Jack Male
  Nico Schlund
  Adam Paxton
  Danny Key
  Conor Mayes
  Keelan Kay
  Sebastian Pohl
  Adam Watson
  Jack Vincent
  Andrew Davidson
  Declan Cox
  Jack Main 
  Aaron Holdstock
  Callum Matthews
  Levy Frauenfelder

International qualifiers:

  Maxim Aldoshin
  Keane Barry
  Jarvis Bautista
  Sean Coohill
  Logan Crooks
  Alexander Faddel
  Jack Faragher
  Steve Fitzpatrick
  Mats Gies
  Tomoya Goto
  Sven Hesse
  Tahuna Irwin
  Patrik Kovács
  Ryan Lynch
  Jesus Vicente Macias
  Paolo Nebrida
  Hampus Norrstrom
  Nicolai Rasmussen
  Lukas Wenig
  Xiaochen Zong

Draw

Group stage

Group 1

Group 2

Group 3

Group 4

Group 5

Group 6

Group 7

Group 8

Group 9

Group 10

Group 11

Group 12

Group 13

Group 14

Group 15

Group 16

Group 17

Group 18

Group 19

Group 20

Group 21

Group 22

Group 23

Group 24

Group 25

Group 26

Group 27

Group 28

Group 29

Group 30

Group 31

Group 32

Knockout Phase

References

World Youth Championship
PDC World Youth Championship
2018
PDC World Youth Championship